Abraham's Valley is a 1993 Portuguese drama film directed by Manoel de Oliveira, based on a novel by Agustina Bessa-Luís, and partially inspired by Gustave Flaubert's 1857 novel Madame Bovary. The film was selected as the Portuguese entry for the Best Foreign Language Film at the 66th Academy Awards, but was not nominated.

Production
Abraham's Valley was filmed in 1.66:1 on 35 mm film.

Plot
Set in mid-20th century Portugal, in the vicinity of Lamego, Ema is a beautiful young girl who is married off to Carlos, an older doctor and friend of her father's. Dissatisfied, she takes several lovers.

Cast
Leonor Silveira as Ema Cardeano Paiva
Cécile Sanz de Alba as young Ema
Luís Miguel Cintra as Carlos Paiva, Ema's husband
Ruy de Carvalho as Paulino Cardeano, Ema's father

Reception
It won the Critics Award at the 1993 São Paulo International Film Festival and the Best Artistic Contribution Award at the 1993 Tokyo International Film Festival.

See also
 List of submissions to the 66th Academy Awards for Best Foreign Language Film
 List of Portuguese submissions for the Academy Award for Best Foreign Language Film

References

External links
 
 Vale Abraão at amordeperdicao.pt .

1993 drama films
1993 films
Films based on works by Agustina Bessa-Luís
Films directed by Manoel de Oliveira
Films produced by Paulo Branco
1990s Portuguese-language films
Portuguese drama films
French drama films
Swiss drama films
Films shot in Portugal
1990s French films